Ioana Mincă (born 27 September 1998) is a Romanian tennis player.

Mincă made her WTA tour debut at the 2016 BRD Bucharest Open.

References

External links 
 
 

1998 births
Living people
Sportspeople from Pitești
Romanian female tennis players